Franciszek Białous (August 7, 1901 – January 14, 1980) was a Polish microbiologist. Between 1955 and 1971, he was the Chair of Microbiology at the Higher School of Agriculture, now .

Decorations
Knight's Cross of the Order of Polonia Restituta
Golden Cross of Merit
Medal of the 10th Anniversary of People's Poland

References

1901 births
1980 deaths
Polish microbiologists
Scientists from Szczecin